In theoretical physics, Seiberg–Witten theory is a theory that determines an exact low-energy effective action (for massless degrees of freedom) of a   supersymmetric gauge theory—namely the metric of the moduli space of vacua.

Seiberg–Witten curves
In general, effective Lagrangians of supersymmetric gauge theories are largely determined by their holomorphic properties and their behavior near the singularities. In particular, in gauge theory with  extended supersymmetry, the moduli space of vacua is a special Kähler manifold and its Kähler potential is constrained by above conditions.

In the original approach, by Seiberg and Witten,  holomorphy and electric-magnetic duality constraints are strong enough to almost uniquely 
constrain the prepotential, and therefore the metric of the moduli space of vacua, for theories with  gauge group. 
 
More generally, consider the example with gauge group SU(n). The classical potential is

This vanishes on the moduli space, so the vacuum expectation value of  can be gauge rotated into Cartan subalgebra, making it a traceless diagonal complex matrix .

Because the fields  no longer have vanishing vacuum expectation value, other fields become heavy due to the Higgs effect.  They are integrated out in order to find the effective  Abelian gauge theory. Its two-derivative, four-fermions low-energy action can be expressed in terms of a single holomorphic function , as follows:

The first term is a perturbative loop calculation and the second is the instanton part where  labels fixed instanton numbers. In theories whose gauge groups are products of unitary groups,  can be computed exactly using localization and the limit shape techniques.

From  we can get the mass of the BPS particles.

One way to interpret this is that these variables  and its dual can be expressed as periods of a meromorphic differential on a Riemann surface called the Seiberg–Witten curve.

Relation to integrable systems
The special Kähler geometry on the moduli space of vacua in Seiberg–Witten theory can be identified with the geometry of the base of complex completely integrable system. The total phase of this complex completely integrable system can be identified with the moduli space of vacua of the 4d theory compactified on a circle. The relation between Seiberg–Witten theory and integrable systems has been reviewed by Eric D'Hoker and D. H. Phong. See Hitchin system.

Seiberg–Witten prepotential via instanton counting
Using supersymmetric localisation techniques, one can explicitly determine the instanton partition function of  super Yang–Mills theory. The Seiberg–Witten prepotential can then be extracted using the localization approach of Nikita Nekrasov.
The latter is a specific background of four dimensional  supergravity. It can be engineered, formally by lifting the [[Supersymmetric gauge theory#Theories with 8 or more SUSY generators (N > 1)|super Yang–Mills theory]] to six dimensions, then compactifying on 2-torus, while twisting the four dimensional spacetime around the two non-contractible cycles. In addition, one twists fermions so as to produce covariantly constant spinors generating unbroken supersymmetries. The two parameters , 
of the -background correspond to the angles of the spacetime rotation.

In Ω-background, we can integrate out all the non-zero modes, so the path integral with the boundary condition  at   
can be expressed as a sum over instanton number of the products and ratios of fermionic and bosonic determinants, producing the so-called Nekrasov partition function.
In the limit where ,  approach 0, this sum is dominated by a unique saddle point.  
On the other hand, when ,  approach 0,

holds.

See also
 Ginzburg–Landau theory
Donaldson theory

References

 (See Section 7.2)

External links

Supersymmetric quantum field theory
Gauge theories